Fragments: Chronicle of a Vanishing (sometimes translated as Fragments: Chronicle of a Disappearance) is a 1991 Croatian film directed by Zrinko Ogresta. The film was selected for the Awards Category Young European Film of the Year for the fourth annual European Film Awards Ceremony (Berlin, 1991).

Cast

Filip Šovagović as Ivan Livaja
Alma Prica as Ivan's Wife
Slavko Juraga as Lovro Livaja
Nada Subotić
Semka Sokolović
Ana Karić
Đuro Utješanović
Ivo Gregurević
Lena Politeo
Božidar Orešković as Tomo Livaja
Kruno Šarić

References

External links

1991 films
1990s Croatian-language films
Croatian drama films
1991 drama films
Jadran Film films